Kenneth Maaten (born 3 March 1953) is a Canadian modern pentathlete. He competed at the 1972 Summer Olympics.

References

1953 births
Living people
Canadian male modern pentathletes
Olympic modern pentathletes of Canada
Modern pentathletes at the 1972 Summer Olympics
Sportspeople from Sarnia